El Chico may refer to:

 El Chico (restaurant), a Mexican restaurant chain started in Dallas, Texas
 El Chico, Florida, an unincorporated community in Monroe County
 El Chico (album) a 1966 album by Chico Hamilton